Bon is a rural locality (a selo) in Arkharinsky District, Amur Oblast, Russia. The population was 7 in 2018. There is 1 street.

Geography 
Bon is located near the right bank of the Arkhara River, 5 km south of Arkhara (the district's administrative centre) by road. Arkhara is the nearest rural locality.

References 

Rural localities in Arkharinsky District